Route 115 is a highway in the St. Louis, Missouri area. Its western terminus is at exit 237 of Interstate 70 (I-70) in Berkeley near Lambert-St. Louis International Airport. Route 115's eastern terminus is also at I-70, at exit 248A, in St. Louis, near the McKinley Bridge. The road is locally known as Natural Bridge Road, Natural Bridge Avenue, and Salisbury Street. It is one of two Missouri Highways that has an odd-numbered designation, yet runs in an east–west direction.

History

Prior to the construction of I-70 and several phases of expansion of Lambert Airport, Route 115 continued west as far as St. Charles, which included a portion of Natural Bridge Road in Bridgeton which has been significantly impacted by recent airport expansion. Portions of the same right-of-way exist as a section of St. Charles Rock Road (which is now Route 180) west of I-270. This route was once part of Route 115.

After the Discovery Bridge on the eastern portion of Route 370 opened in 1992, the portions of Route 115 west of the airport were removed from the state highway system. In 1998, the former Route 115 bridge across the Missouri River was demolished.

Major intersections

See also
 Old St. Charles Bridge
 McKinley Bridge

References

115
Transportation in St. Louis County, Missouri
Roads in Greater St. Louis